Adigun Taofeek Salami (born 6 May 1988) is a Nigerian former professional footballer who played as a defensive midfielder.

Club career
Salami was born in Lagos, Nigeria.

Adigun came to FC Midtjylland from their Nigerian football academy FC Ebedei. In the winter 2006–07 and in January 2008 he went on trials at English club Chelsea. However, on 30 October 2008 he signed a new contract running to 30 June 2012.

He joined SønderjyskE on a free transfer on 1 June 2012. Throughout his time there, he struggled with knee problems.

In 2016, Salami joined Middelfart in the Danish 2nd Division. He left the club in June 2018, and subsequently retired from football due to persistent injuries.

International career
On 19 October 2008, Salami told the Danish press that he did not find it inconceivable to join the Denmark national team, should he be granted Danish citizenship.

References

External links
 
 
 Career statistics at Danmarks Radio

1988 births
Living people
Sportspeople from Lagos
Nigerian footballers
Association football midfielders
F.C. Ebedei players
FC Midtjylland players
Ikast FS players
SønderjyskE Fodbold players
Middelfart Boldklub players
Danish Superliga players
Yoruba sportspeople
Nigerian expatriate footballers
Nigerian expatriate sportspeople in Denmark
Expatriate men's footballers in Denmark